Catagela adjurella is a moth in the family Crambidae. It was described by Francis Walker in 1863. It is found in Sri Lanka, India and China (Shandong, Henan, Jiangsu, Anhui, Zhejiang, Hubei, Hunan, Guangdong, Hainan, Yunnan).

References

Moths described in 1863
Schoenobiinae